Union Point Sports Complex is a multi-purpose sports complex in Weymouth, Massachusetts, and is home to the New England Free Jacks of Major League Rugby.

History
Union Point is a 25-acre sports complex with indoor and outdoor facilities and is used for a variety of field sports; such as lacrosse, rugby union, and soccer.

On December 1, 2018, Union Point hosted its first professional rugby match, between the Free Jacks and Rugby United New York. Rugby United New York would win the match 38 to 35.

In the spring of 2019, Union Point hosted four matches of the Cara Cup, a rugby union competition hosted by the Free Jacks.

In the fall of 2019, the Free Jacks announced their schedule for the 2020 season and that Union Point would be their official home venue for their first full season in MLR.

Rugby

International club matches

Facilities

References

External links
 Facebook
 Twitter
 Instagram

Lacrosse venues in Massachusetts
Major League Rugby stadiums
New England Free Jacks
Rugby union stadiums in the United States
Soccer venues in Massachusetts
Buildings and structures in Weymouth, Massachusetts